The Sanchi Archaeological Museum is a museum near the archaeological site of Sanchi. It houses various artifacts which were found in the nearby Buddhist complex. It was established in 1919, by John Marshall, the then director of the Archaeological Survey of India.

Gallery

References

Sources
 Catalogue of the Sanchi Archaeological Museum (1922)
 Sanchi Museum Website with photo galleries

Art museums and galleries in India
Archaeological museums in India